The Royal K. Fuller House is a historic house located at 294 Loudon Road in Colonie, Albany County, New York.

Description and history 
It was built in 1926, and is a one-story single dwelling designed in an eclectic style incorporating details from medieval European architecture. It features a steeply pitched flared gable roof covered with rough polychrome slate. It also has leaded and stained glass windows, irregular brick and brickwork, and intentionally gouged woodwork.

It was listed on the National Register of Historic Places on October 3, 1985.

References

Houses on the National Register of Historic Places in New York (state)
Houses completed in 1926
Houses in Albany County, New York
National Register of Historic Places in Albany County, New York